Meena Rana is an Indian Uttarakhandi singer. She has released many Garhwali and Kumaoni music albums.

Albums
Utarakhandi albums 
 Chand taro maa
 Meri Khati Mitthi
 Darbar Nirala Sai ka

Utarakhandi Garhwali albums 
 Teri meri Maya
 Meru Utarakhand
 Chilbilat
 Mohana
 Chandra
 Lalita Chi Hum
Utarakhandi Garhwali songs

 Sushma With Gajender Rana
 Bhalu Lagdu Bhanuli with Narender singh Negi 
 Harya Bharya boun with Pritam Bhartwan
 Kai Gaon ki holi  with Manglesh Dangwal
 Hoor Ki Pari With Anil Raturi 
 Madhuli  with Chanderveer Aarya

Awards

Young Uttarakhand Cine Award

References

External links 

 
 
 

Living people
Women musicians from Delhi
Indian women folk singers
Indian folk singers
Singers from Delhi
21st-century Indian women singers
21st-century Indian singers
Year of birth missing (living people)